Croton michauxii, commonly known as elliptical rushfoil, and Michaux's croton, is a plant species in the family Euphorbiaceae that is native to the United States. It is an annual plant.

Conservation status in the United States
It is listed as a special concern and believed extirpated in Connecticut.  It is endangered in Indiana and extirpated in Pennsylvania.

References

michauxii